is a manga series written and illustrated by .

Plot
The story follows , a young man who apprentices as a Noh performer with the aim of eventually becoming a Noh master.

Reception

Sales
 Volume 6 has sold 84,443 copies (as of November 17, 2008)
 Volume 7 has sold 77,390 copies (as of May 10, 2009)
 Volume 8 has sold 68,782 copies (as of July 11, 2010)
 Volume 9 has sold 66,575 (as of July 10, 2011)
 Volume 10 had sold 67,085 copies (as of March 11, 2012)
 Volume 11 has sold 79,762 copies (as of January 13, 2013)

References

External links

Hakusensha manga
Josei manga
Theatre in anime and manga
Noh